Sivagnanam Shritharan (born 8 December 1968) is a Sri Lankan Tamil teacher, politician and Member of Parliament.

Early life and family
Shritharan was born on 8 December 1968. He is from Kandavalai in Kilinochchi District though he is originally from the island of Neduntivu (Delft) in Jaffna District. He was educated at Jaffna Hindu College. After school he joined the University of Jaffna.

Shritharan is married to the sister of Brigadier Theepan (Velayuthapillai Baheerathakumarn) who was a senior military commander in the Liberation Tigers of Tamil Eelam.

Career
Shritharan taught at several schools in Kilinochchi District and was principal of Kilinochchi Maha Vidyalayam.

Shritharan contested the 2010 parliamentary election as one of the Tamil National Alliance electoral alliance's candidates in Jaffna District and was elected to the Parliament. He was re-elected at the 2015 and 2020 parliamentary elections.

Assassination attempt
On 7 March 2011 Shritharan was traveling in a van from Kilinochchi to Colombo to attend a meeting of Parliament the following day. Traveling with Sritharan in the van were four others including a police guard. At around 5.30pm the van was on the A12 highway near Nochchiyagama, Anuradhapura District, when three men standing by a white van parked on the roadside pulled out guns and started shooting at Shritharan's van. The men also threw hand grenades at the van. Sritharan's police guard fired back, forcing the attackers to flee in their white van which had no number plates. No one was seriously injured in the incident. Shritharan has blamed the Eelam People's Democratic Party, a government backed paramilitary group, for the assassination attempt. The EPDP has been implicated in a number of assassinations. Speaker Chamal Rajapaksa ordered an investigation into the assassination attempt.

Electoral history

References

1968 births
Alumni of Jaffna Hindu College
Alumni of the University of Jaffna
Failed assassination attempts in Sri Lanka
Illankai Tamil Arasu Kachchi politicians
Living people
Members of the 14th Parliament of Sri Lanka
Members of the 15th Parliament of Sri Lanka
Members of the 16th Parliament of Sri Lanka
People from Northern Province, Sri Lanka
Sri Lankan Hindus
Sri Lankan Tamil politicians
Sri Lankan Tamil teachers
Tamil National Alliance politicians